Carmen Smith-Brown (born 16 February 1943) is a Jamaican sprinter. She competed in the 100 metres at the 1964 Summer Olympics and the 1968 Summer Olympics.

References

1943 births
Living people
Athletes (track and field) at the 1964 Summer Olympics
Athletes (track and field) at the 1968 Summer Olympics
Jamaican female sprinters
Jamaican female hurdlers
Olympic athletes of Jamaica
Athletes (track and field) at the 1962 British Empire and Commonwealth Games
Athletes (track and field) at the 1966 British Empire and Commonwealth Games
Athletes (track and field) at the 1970 British Commonwealth Games
Commonwealth Games silver medallists for Jamaica
Commonwealth Games bronze medallists for Jamaica
Commonwealth Games medallists in athletics
Athletes (track and field) at the 1975 Pan American Games
Pan American Games competitors for Jamaica
Competitors at the 1962 Central American and Caribbean Games
Competitors at the 1966 Central American and Caribbean Games
Central American and Caribbean Games gold medalists for Jamaica
Central American and Caribbean Games bronze medalists for Jamaica
People from Saint Catherine Parish
Central American and Caribbean Games medalists in athletics
20th-century Jamaican women
21st-century Jamaican women
Medallists at the 1966 British Empire and Commonwealth Games
Medallists at the 1962 British Empire and Commonwealth Games